The 2006 Denver Outlaws season was the inaugural season for the Denver Outlaws of Major League Lacrosse. Coming in as a 2006 expansion team, the Outlaws began their first season on May 20, 2006 with a 24–14 win at home against the Chicago Machine. They finished the regular season with a 10–2 record, remaining undefeated on the road and clinching the Western Conference against the San Francisco Dragons in the semifinal by the score of 23–14, but would lose in the championship game against the Philadelphia Barrage by the score of 23–12.

Regular season

Schedule

Postseason

Standings

References

External links
 Team Website 

Major League Lacrosse seasons
Denver Outlaws